The Chicago Brown Bombers were a semi-pro and Negro league baseball team in the 1940s. They played in the Negro Major League and later the United States League.

The Brown Bombers played in Minnesota in July, 1942 against the Twin Cities Gophers in Negro Major Baseball League of America games.  In 1945 the Brown Bombers were members of The United States League for one season before the league folded.

References

Negro league baseball teams
Defunct baseball teams in Chicago
Defunct baseball teams in Illinois
Baseball teams established in 1942
Baseball teams disestablished in 1945